Madanpally is a village in Ranga Reddy district in Andhra Pradesh, India. It falls under Shamshabad mandal.

References

Villages in Ranga Reddy district